NFHS may refer to:

National Family Health Survey
National Federation of State High School Associations
National Fish Hatchery System
North Forest High School
North Forney High School